Aleš Čeh (born 7 April 1968) is a former Slovenian footballer who played as a midfielder. He represented Slovenia at Euro 2000 and the 2002 FIFA World Cup.

Club career
Čeh played for the youth team of Slovan, and later also for their city rivals Olimpija. In 1992, he transferred to the Austrian second division side Grazer AK. With his steady midfield-play, he helped the team back to the top flight in 1995. After winning the Austrian Cup and the Austrian Supercup in 2000 and 2002, he left GAK in summer 2003 and signed for Maribor until winter 2004, when he went back to Austria, this time to LASK Linz.

After that he moved back to Olimpija Ljubljana. He retired from football after the 2008–09 season and worked at the club initially as a youth coach and later as assistant manager to Dušan Kosič. In June 2011 he took up the position of manager at Grazer AK.

International career
Čeh was capped 74 times and scored one goal for Slovenia. He was a participant at the 2000 European Championship and the 2002 World Cup.

Career statistics

International 
Scores and results list Slovenia's goal tally first, score column indicates score after each Čeh goal.

Honours

Olimpija
 Slovenian PrvaLiga: 1991–92

GAK
 ÖFB-Cup: 2000, 2002
 Austrian Supercup: 2000, 2002

Maribor
 Slovenian Cup: 2003–04

References

External links
 Player profile at NZS 

1968 births
Living people
Sportspeople from Maribor
Yugoslav footballers
Slovenian footballers
Association football midfielders
Slovenian expatriate footballers
Slovenian expatriate sportspeople in Austria
Expatriate footballers in Austria
NK Olimpija Ljubljana (1945–2005) players
Grazer AK players
NK Maribor players
LASK players
NK Olimpija Ljubljana (2005) players
Yugoslav Second League players
Yugoslav First League players
Slovenian PrvaLiga players
2. Liga (Austria) players
Austrian Football Bundesliga players
Slovenian Second League players
Slovenia international footballers
UEFA Euro 2000 players
2002 FIFA World Cup players
Slovenian football managers
Grazer AK managers
NK Rudar Velenje managers
Slovenian expatriate football managers
Expatriate football managers in Austria